The Zigula or Zigua language, Chizigua, is a Bantu language of Tanzania and Somalia, where the Mushunguli (or Mushungulu) dialect is spoken.

Mushunguli
The Mushunguli or Mushungulu dialect is spoken by about 23,000 people from the Bantu ethnic minority of southern Somalia, in Jamaame, Kismayo, Mogadishu, and the Juba River valley.

Mushunguli shows affinities with adjacent Bantu varieties. In particular, it shares strong lexical and grammatical similarities with the language of the Zigua people who inhabit Tanzania, one of the areas in south-eastern Africa where many Bantu in Somalia are known to have been captured from as slaves during the 19th century. Ethnologue notes that the Mushunguli in Tanzania are the Wazegua.

Many Mushunguli Bantu men also speak as working languages the Afro-Asiatic Maay and Somali languages of their Somali neighbors.

Phonology
There is no official or traditional orthography for Mushunguli. However, spelling practices from related Bantu languages can easily be adopted to render the language with minimal phonetic diacritics.

Vowels

Consonants 

Tone
Vowel length is not distinctive, but phonetic length is especially associated with falling tones as in chîga 'leg'. The tone system is similar to that of Tanzanian Zigua.

Notes

Further reading

Hout, Katherine, and Eric Bakovic. "To fuse or not to fuse: Approaches to exceptionality in Mushunguli (Somali Chizigula)." (2014).

MacSaveny, Erin, and Erin MacSaveny. "Verbal tone in Chizigula." Occasional Papers in Applied Linguistics 5 (2009).

Temkin Martinez, Michal, and Haley K. Boone. "On the presence of voiceless nasalization in apparently effaced Somali Chizigula prenasalized stops." The Journal of the Acoustical Society of America 139.4 (2016): 2218-2218.

External links
Zigula dictionary

 
Northeast Coast Bantu languages